Oxana Alexandrovna Bratisheva (born 5 June 2000) is a Russian ice hockey player and member of the Russian national ice hockey team, currently playing in the Zhenskaya Hockey League (ZhHL) with SKIF Nizhny Novgorod.

She represented Russia at the 2019 IIHF Women's World Championship and represented the Russian Olympic Committee at the 2021 IIHF Women's World Championship.

References

External links
 

2000 births
Living people
Russian women's ice hockey forwards
Sportspeople from Chelyabinsk
HC SKIF players
Ice hockey players at the 2022 Winter Olympics
Olympic ice hockey players of Russia